Arzano is a commune in the Finistère department in Brittany in northwestern France. It lies on the D22 road.

Population
Inhabitants of Arzano are called Arzanois.

Geography

Arzano belongs historically to Vannetais. The river Ellé forms the commune's western border and the river Scorff forms the commune's eastern border.

Map

Sights
The commune contains the ruins of the Château de La Roche-Moysan, Château de Kerlarec (19th century) and the 16th century Saint-Laurent church.

See also
Communes of the Finistère department
Henri Gouzien, sculptor of Arzano War Memorial

References

External links

 
 Mayors of Finistère Association  

Communes of Finistère